End of Watch Ride to Remember was a charity long-distance motorcycle ride that started and ended in Spokane, Washington, traveling  around the United States between June 1 and August 7, 2020. The purpose of the ride, organized by ex-Yakima County Sheriff's deputy Jagrut Shah, chairman of sponsoring organization called Beyond the  Call of Duty, was to honor 146 U.S. police officers killed in the line of duty the prior year by visiting each of the departments where they served. "End of watch" is a phrase used in connection with officers killed on duty. The event was to be funded by sponsors, until many pulled out following the 2020 George Floyd protests against police violence, at which point the organizers self-funded.

References

Sources

WPMT, Penn.
WMBF, S.C.
KIWA, Iowa

External links

Motorcycling subculture in the United States
Law enforcement memorials